Sedgwick may refer to:

People
Sedgwick (surname)

Places

Australia
 Sedgwick, Victoria

England
 Sedgwick, Cumbria, England
 Sedgwick, West Sussex, England
 Sidgwick Avenue, Cambridge, England

United States
 Sedgwick, Arkansas
 Sedgwick, Colorado
 Sedgwick, Kansas
 Sedgwick, Maine
 Sedgwick, Missouri
 Sedgwick, Wisconsin
 Sedgwick County, Colorado
 Sedgwick County, Kansas
 Sedgwick Avenue, Bronx, New York

Schools 
 Sedgwick Middle School in West Hartford, Connecticut
 Sedgwick Elementary School in Cupertino, California

Transport
 Sedgwick station (CTA), a Chicago 'L' station
 Sedgwick station (SEPTA), a commuter rail station in Philadelphia

Companies
 Sedgwick Group, a British insurance broker

See also
 Sedgewick (disambiguation)